Demirhisar may refer to:
 Demirhisar, former Turkish name of Sidirokastro, a town in Greece
 , a Turkish merchant ship in service from 1938 to 1985

See also 
 Demir Hisar (disambiguation)